Magic mirror or The Magic Mirror may refer to:

 Mirrors in literature, such as:
 Magic Mirror (Snow White), a mystical object featured in the story of Snow White
 The Magic Mirror (ballet), a 1903 ballet based on Snow White
 The Magic Mirror (fairy tale), Rhodesian tale in Andrew Lang's The Orange Fairy Book (1906)
 Magic Mirror (book), by Orson Scott Card
 Magic Mirror (M.C. Escher), a 1946 print by Escher
 Magic Mirror (film), a 2005 film
 Magic Mirror (album), a 2021 album by Pearl Charles
 The Magic Mirror, a work by American novelist Sylvia Plath
 Chinese magic mirror, an ancient bronze mirror which projects an image with reflected light

See also
 Catoptromancy, divination using a mirror
 Infinity mirror, two mirrors that produce an illusion of infinite space